The 1957 USAC Championship Car season consisted of 13 races, beginning in Speedway, Indiana on May 30 and concluding in Phoenix, Arizona on November 11. There were also five non-championship events.  The USAC National Champion was Jimmy Bryan and the Indianapolis 500 winner was Sam Hanks. Keith Andrews was killed in crash while practicing for the Indianapolis 500; he was 36 years old.

Schedule and results

 Indianapolis 500 was USAC-sanctioned and counted towards the 1957 FIA World Championship of Drivers title.
 Run in three heats of 166 miles (267 km).
 No pole is awarded for the Pikes Peak Hill Climb, in this schedule on the pole is the driver who started first. No lap led was awarded for the Pikes Peak Hill Climb, however, a lap was awarded to the drivers that completed the climb.

Final points standings

References
 
 
 http://media.indycar.com/pdf/2011/IICS_2011_Historical_Record_Book_INT6.pdf  (p. 280-281)

See also
 1957 Indianapolis 500

USAC Championship Car season
USAC Championship Car
1957 in American motorsport